Sunny Hill is an unincorporated community in Washington Parish, Louisiana, United States. The community is located   NW of Franklinton, Louisiana.

References

Unincorporated communities in Washington Parish, Louisiana
Unincorporated communities in Louisiana